Gtk2-Perl is a set of wrappers for the Perl programming language around the GTK and further GNOME libraries. Gtk-Perl is free and open-source software licensed under the GNU Lesser General Public License (LGPL) version 2.1. Developers and interested parties can usually be found on the IRC channel #gtk-perl on irc.gnome.org.

Gtk2-Perl is part of the official GNOME Platform Bindings release.

Example 
use Gtk2 '-init';

$window = Gtk2::Window->new('toplevel');
$window->set_title("Hello World!");

$button = Gtk2::Button->new("Press me");
$button->signal_connect(clicked => sub { print "Hello again - the button was pressed\n"; });

$window->add($button);
$window->show_all;

Gtk2->main;

0;

The sample program creates a GTK Window titled "Hello World!". The window contains a Button labelled "Press me." When the button is pressed, the message "Hello again - the button was pressed" is displayed on the console via the callback inside the anonymous subroutine connected to the "clicked" signal.

References

External links
 GTK2-Perl homepage on SourceForge.net
 https://git.gnome.org/browse/perl-Gtk2/
 https://git.gnome.org/browse/perl-Gtk3/
 A tool helps compile gtk2-perl under Windows

GTK language bindings
Perl modules